Fereydunshahr ski resort is the only standard ski resort of Isfahan Province. It is located in the Zagros mountain range, near Fereydunshahr and also the village of Choqyurt.

See also
List of ski areas and resorts in Iran
List of ski areas and resorts
Sports in Iran

References

External links 
location of the ski resort on Google maps
pictures of the ski resort in a cold and populated day
introduction, equipment and pictures of the ski resort (in Persian)

Ski areas and resorts in Iran
Sport in Isfahan Province
Tourist attractions in Isfahan Province
Buildings and structures in Isfahan Province